Atyphopsis obscura is a moth in the subfamily Arctiinae. It was described by George Hampson in 1887. It is found in the Espírito Santo, Brazil.

References

Arctiinae
Moths described in 1887
Moths of South America